Alena Šeredová (born 21 March 1978) is a Czech model and actress who lives and works in Italy.

Career 
Šeredová was born Prague. Her modeling career began at the age of 15. Five years later, she was first runner-up of Miss Czech Republic 1998 and her country's representative at Miss World 1998 where she placed fourth equal in the finals. She started her career as a model in 2002. She was chosen by the Italian comedian Giorgio Panariello to co-host his own prime-time TV show Torno Sabato. She has been featured on the covers of several magazines including Penthouse Europe, Playboy Europe, Spy, Extreme and Quo. In 2005, she was chosen to star in Max Calendar.

Personal life 
Šeredová married Italian goalkeeper Gianluigi Buffon. They have two sons, Louis Thomas Buffon, who was born on December 28, 2007, and David Lee who was born on 1 November 2009. They married in June 2011, and separated in May 2014. She has a sister named Eliška, who is also a model. 

Alena co-owns the Italian clothing-line (Baci e Abbracci) together with Buffon's former national teammate, Christian Vieri.

As of 2014 Šeredová has been in a relationship with Italian businessman Alessandro Nasi. They have a daughter together who was born in 2020.

Filmography
 Ho visto le stelle (I Have Seen the Stars) (2003; Viděl jsem hvězdy); comedy, running time: 91 minutes, director: Vincenzo Salemme
 Christmas in Love (2004; Zamilované Vánoce); comedy, running time: 118 minutes, director: Neri Parenti

References

External links

 Profile at CzechModels.cz

1978 births
Living people
Czech female models
Czech film actresses
Czech expatriates in Italy
Association footballers' wives and girlfriends
Miss World 1998 delegates
Actresses from Prague
Models from Prague
Buffon family